Occupy Philadelphia was a collaboration that included nonviolent protests and demonstrations with an aim to overcome economic inequality, corporate greed and the influence of corporations and lobbyists on government. The protest took place at Thomas Paine Plaza, which is adjacent to Philadelphia's City Hall.

As of June 2012, Occupy Philadelphia had continued to engage in organized meetings, events and actions.

Chronology of events

2011

 September 29 - The first general assembly occurred at Arch Street Methodist United Church.
 October 4 - The second general assembly attracted 800–1000 people and occurred at Arch Street Methodist United Church The Occupy Philadelphia web site was launched.
 October 6 - The first camp out associated with the protest occurred. The occupation began with a march
 October 8 - Occupy Philadelphia marched with Matt Milly to the Liberty Bell.
 October 15 - Quakers support Occupy Philadelphia.
 October 20 - Occupy Philadelphia continues. An unofficial count of tents in Dilworth Plaza totaled 304. Protesters were informed about upcoming scheduled renovations for Dilworth Plaza (for the construction of Dilworth Park, which has since been completed), and city officials have been conferring with protesters about relocating the protest to another location.
 October 21 - Occupy Philadelphia gathered at the University of Pennsylvania to confront Eric Cantor, the Republican House Majority Leader who has been highly critical of the Occupy movement protests. Cantor decided to cancel his lecture. The incident was called Occupy Eric Cantor.
 October 23 - Rock band Portugal. The Man play an acoustic set of songs to support the Occupy movement. Fifteen members of Occupy Philadelphia were arrested for blocking traffic near the police administration building.
 October 27 - Occupy Philadelphia encampment reaches 23rd day, remaining one of the most peaceful "occupy" protests.
 October 28 - Angela Davis speaks at Occupy Philadelphia following an appearance at the University of Pennsylvania.
 November 2 - Nine protesters were arrested at the headquarters of cable company Comcast. One protester said she was protesting Comcast because their headquarters was not blighted like other buildings in the neighborhood.
 November 4 - One hundred protesters from the Occupy movement marched from Dilworth Plaza to the Rittenhouse hotel to chant, "Hey Romney, picture this, no more greedy politics." Mitt Romney managed to side-step the group to attend the fundraiser that was staged on his behalf. The fundraiser's price tag was $10,000 per plate. No arrests or injuries were reported.
 November 8 - Frances Fox Piven gave a speech at Occupy Philadelphia following an appearance at Temple University.
 November 13 -  Rev. Jesse Jackson makes an unannounced appearance and gives a brief speech.
 November 15 - Estimated date of the start of the construction project on Dilworth Plaza. The city wants the occupation to move from the plaza.
 November 18 - 14 arrested at a Wells Fargo sit-in.
 November 30 - Police evict the protesters from Dilworth Plaza beginning at 1:20 AM, 52 people are arrested. Urban theorist David Harvey meets with Occupiers at a teach-in at the University of Pennsylvania.

2012
April 2012 - protesters arrested after the eviction of their City Hall encampment were acquitted on all charges.

See also

Occupy articles
 List of global Occupy protest locations
 Occupy movement
 Timeline of Occupy Wall Street
 We are the 99%

Other Protests
 15 October 2011 global protests
 2011 United States public employee protests
 2011 Wisconsin protests

Related articles
 Arab Spring
 Corruption Perceptions Index
 Economic inequality
 Grassroots movement

 Income inequality in the United States
 Plutocracy
 Protest
 Tea Party protests
 Wealth inequality in the United States

Related portals:

References

Additional sources
 Brown, Catherine (October 13, 2011.) "Occupy Philly Takes a Stand Against "Corporate Greed"." NBC Philadelphia. Accessed October 2011.
 Brown, Catherine; Stamm, Dan (October 13, 2011.) "Occupy Philly Is Costing Taxpayers: Mayor." NBC Philadelphia. Accessed October 2011.
 Scott, Katherine (November 13, 2011.) "Man arrested in Occupy Philly sexual assault" 6 ABC Philadelphia. Accessed November 2011.

External links

 Occupy Philadelphia facebook page (primary active site)
 Occupy Philadelphia on livestream
 Occupy Philly archived website
 Occupy Philly Media archived blog
 Occupy Philadelphia records
 Occupy Philadelphia on Flickr
 Photos of Occupy PhiladelphiaFlickr
 Who Threw the Can of Green Paint? The First Two Weeks of Occupy Philadelphia. An account of the formation of Occupy Philadelphia, written by a participant for Viewpoint Magazine

Occupy movement in the United States
Riots and civil disorder in Philadelphia
2011 in Pennsylvania
2011 in Philadelphia
Culture of Philadelphia
Organizations based in Philadelphia